Sigrid Combüchen (born 16 January 1942) is a Swedish novelist, essayist, literary critic and journalist.

Career

Sigrid Combüchen was born in Solingen, Germany in the Ruhr territory. Shortly after the War her family moved to Sweden.

Sigrid Combüchen made her debut at the age of eighteen with the novel  (1960). She worked in journalism and on her academic degree before she returned to fiction seventeen years later with the novel  (In Northern Europe) and then  (Warmth) in 1980. 
Her first internationally renowned novel is Byron, published in 1988. The book paints a picture of the English poet through a compositional change between present and past, where Byron is partly illustrated by a group of Byron enthusiasts of today and partly through the environment in his own time. It was translated into other languages including English, German, French, Spanish and Dutch the following years.
Over a period of twenty years Combüchen has written three novels studying the change of mentality in national life.
She has used themes of saga, as well as fantasy in i.e.  (1998), a dystopian novel drawing on the medieval story.
Her novel  (Scraps. A Lady's novel) 2010, was translated into many languages and awarded several prizes, most importantly the Swedish August Prize for best novel of the year. Her latest novel  (2017) is a story of two French refugees surviving in the Swedish countryside during 1944–45. It is soon to be presented in a stage version.
She has also written a few biographies, among them an essayistic account of the life and work of Knut Hamsun.
She was one of the editors of the magazine  for a number of years and has been a contributor to several other literary magazines and to several newspapers on a regular basis.

Between 2004 and 2017 she was a teacher of creative writing at Lund University.
She has served on several boards and committees in Swedish, as well as Nordic literary and academic organisations.

Awards 
She received the 2004 Selma Lagerlöf Prize and in 2007 she received an Honorary Doctorate in Literature at Lund University, Sweden, for her literary merits. In 2010, she received the August Prize for the novel  (Scraps. A Lady's novel).

Bibliography
, 1960 
, 1977 
, 1980 
Byron, 1988 
, 1992 
, 1995 
, 1998 
, 2003 
, 2006 
Spill: En damroman, 2010 
  , 2014 
  , 2017

References

External links
 
 

1942 births
Living people
20th-century Swedish novelists
21st-century Swedish novelists
21st-century Swedish writers
Swedish literary critics
Swedish women literary critics
Selma Lagerlöf Prize winners
Dobloug Prize winners
August Prize winners
Swedish women writers
Swedish women novelists
Swedish essayists
Swedish women essayists
Swedish women biographers
Swedish journalists
Swedish women journalists
Swedish biographers